The Cathedral of Holy Wisdom was a cathedral in Polotsk that was built by Prince Vseslav Briacheslavich (1044–1101) between 1044 (first mentioned in the Voskresenskaia Chronicle under the year 1056) and 1066.  It stands at the confluence of the Polota River and Western Dvina River on the eastern side of the city and is probably the oldest church in Belarus.

The cathedral is named after the Holy Wisdom of God, similar to the  Saint Sophia Cathedral in Kyiv and Saint Sophia Cathedral in Novgorod.  After building his own cathedral, Vseslav, who was an izgoi prince, tried to seize the Kyivan throne.  Failing in that attempt, he raided the surrounding principalities. In 1067, he raided Novgorod the Great and looted the Cathedral of Holy Wisdom, bringing a bell and other looting back to decorate his own Cathedral of Holy Wisdom.  The cathedral is mentioned in The Tale of Igor's Campaign, where it says that Vseslav would make nocturnal trips to Kyiv as a werewolf and would hear the bells of Holy Wisdom at Polotsk as they rang for matins.

The cathedral has been significantly rebuilt and heavily modified between the eleventh and eighteenth centuries.  Indeed, only parts of the church date back to the time of Vseslav, although the names of the builders are inscribed in a stone at the base of the cathedral: David, Toma, Mikula, Kopes, Petr, and Vorish.  The burial vaults of 16 Polotsk princes dating back to the eleventh century have been uncovered (indeed, Vseslav himself, said to have been a sorcerer as well as a werewolf, was buried in the cathedral he built).  According to the Voskresenskaia Letopis (s.a. 1156), the cathedral originally had seven domes, later reduced to five after it was rebuilt following the fire of 1447. During 1596–1654 and 1668–1839,  the church was a Greek Catholic (Uniate) cathedral. It was rebuilt again in 1618–1620 by Greek Catholic Archbishop St. Josaphat Kuntsevych (rr. 1618–1623) following a fire in 1607, and again after a fire destroyed the cathedral and the city in 1643. 

In 1705–1710, Peter the Great and Aleksandr Menshikov used the church as a Powder House, which later exploded.  Over the next almost three decades (1738–1765), the Uniate archbishop, Florian Hrebnicki, was rebuilding the cathedral. The Vilnius architect Johann Christoph Glaubitz is responsible for the current cathedral's appearance, which is an example of the Vilnian Baroque style.  Currently, it is a baroque structure with towers and the domes have being removed (or at least not rebuilt). The cathedral used to have a library and other important cultural artifacts, but the library was destroyed when King Stephen Báthory of Poland took the city during the Livonian War in the late 16th century.  The town was occupied by the French during the Napoleonic Invasion of 1812 (indeed, two battles were fought at Polotsk in August and October, the second seeing house-to-house fighting). It was also occupied during the Nazi Invasion in the 1940s when a large number of Polotsk's inhabitants were slaughtered.

The cathedral has changed functions several times over the centuries. With the Union of Brest, the church became the cathedral of the Ruthenian Catholic Archeparchy of Polotsk–Vitebsk.  During the Russian-Polish War, the church was taken by the Russian troops of Tsar Alexei Mikhailovich, who visited the cathedral in 1654. In 1668, the cathedral  again passed to the Greek Catholics and remained as such until 1839 when Bishop Joseph Siemaszko terminated the union and transferred jurisdiction to the Russian Orthodox Church.  During the Soviet period, the cathedral housed the Polotsk Regional State Archive (from 1949 to 1954.)  In 1967, the restoration work took place as the cathedral was to be turned into a museum of atheism, but the museum was moved to Vitebsk in 1969.  The cathedral is now part of the State Museum-Preserve of Polotsk and used as a concert hall with an organ. There is an ongoing conversation of returning the building to the Russian Orthodox Church.

See also 
 Saint Sophia Cathedral in Kyiv
 Saint Sophia Cathedral in Novgorod
 Hagia Sophia
 Cathedral of the Theotokos, Vilnius

References 

Cathedrals in Belarus
Landmarks in Belarus
Buildings and structures in Vitebsk Region
Museums in Vitebsk Region
Buildings and structures in Polotsk
Eastern Orthodox church buildings in Belarus
Eastern Catholic church buildings in Europe
Catholic church buildings in Belarus
11th-century Eastern Orthodox church buildings